This Other Eden is a 2023 novel by American writer Paul Harding.

Composition and writing
The novel presents a fictionalized version of Malaga Island, dubbed "Apple Island" in the book. Harding began the earliest version of the novel by writing a scene featuring Mrs. Hale, a character from his novel Enon. In the scene, Mrs. Hale and members of her family sit in a meadow, and observe an unknown person, inspired by Charles Ethan Porter, painting.

Reception
According to literary review aggregator Book Marks, the novel received mostly "Rave" reviews. Danez Smith, in a review published by The New York Times, praised Harding's prose. In a review published by the Financial Times, Catherine Taylor also praised Harding's writing.

Writing for the The Los Angeles Times, Mark Athitakis compared the book unfavorably to Harding's previous works. Athitakis also wrote that Harding's writing was "fussed over".

References

2023 American novels
W. W. Norton & Company books
English-language novels
Novels set in Maine